Shawn Toovey (born March 1, 1983 in Lincoln, Nebraska, U.S.) is an American actor. He is best known for his role as Brian Cooper in the popular drama Dr. Quinn, Medicine Woman for which Toovey won four Young Artist Awards.

His family moved to San Antonio, Texas when he was four and ultimately ended up in California, where Shawn spent the next six years playing Brian Cooper on the CBS television series Dr. Quinn, Medicine Woman.  He is a founding member of the Children's Board of the Audrey Hepburn Hollywood for Children Foundation. He is also involved in the Juvenile Diabetes Foundation, The Braille Institute, Camp Ronald McDonald, Meals on Wheels and various child abuse preventions organizations. 

Toovey played the role of Brian opposite fellow Dr. Quinn actor Orson Bean in the theater production of A Christmas Carol. Toovey has received several awards to date, among them:

 1994: Youth in Film Award - Best Actor in a Drama Series, 10 and under 
 1994: Spirit of the Prairie Award (from the governor of Nebraska) 
 1996: Young Artist Awards - Best Actor in a Drama Series 
 1996: Michael Landon Award - For: Dr. Quinn, Medicine Woman 
 (1993) 1997: Young Artist Awards - Best Actor in a Drama Series.

Filmography

References

External links

Living people
1983 births
20th-century American male actors
21st-century American male actors
Male actors from Nebraska
American male child actors
American male film actors
American male television actors
Actors from Lincoln, Nebraska